Carrie Nuttall (born November 11, 1963) is an American photographer who works primarily in the music and entertainment industry. She is the widow of Neil Peart, drummer and lyricist of Canadian rock band Rush, married from 2000 until his death in 2020. Their daughter, Olivia Louise Peart, was born in 2009.

In 2005, Nuttall published Rhythm and Light, a portrait book capturing intimate photos of Peart in the recording studio.

Nuttall and her daughter live in Santa Monica, California. They also spend time in a home in the Laurentian Mountains of Quebec, Canada.

References

Sources
 Ghost Rider: Travels on the Healing Road – by Neil Peart (2002)
 Travelling Music: Traveling Music: The Soundtrack to My Life and Times – by Neil Peart (2003)
 Rhythm and Light – by Carrie Nuttall (2005)
 Rush: Chemistry: The Definitive Biography – by Jon Collins (2005)
 Roadshow: Landscape With Drums: A Concert Tour by Motorcycle – by Neil Peart (2006)
 Far and Away: A Prize Every Time – by Neil Peart (2011)
 Rush in Rio (2003)
 Rush: Beyond the Lighted Stage (2010)

American photographers
American women photographers
Living people
Place of birth missing (living people)
Rush (band)
People from Santa Monica, California
1963 births